"Crown of Prussia" may refer to:

 the Crown of Frederick I
 the Crown of Wilhelm II, also known as the Hohenzollern Crown
 Crown of Prussia, a synecdoche (naming the whole by the part) for King of Prussia

See also
 Order of the Crown (Prussia), an order of chivalry